Pancho Reyes Huang born on April 22, 1955, was the 18th Mayor of the Municipality of Iba, Zambales. Prior to his appointment as Mayor, he was the elected Vice-Mayor of Iba, Zambales. He was then elected Mayor from 1989-2001.
He was known for his kindness to people especially the Senior Citizens.

Death
On November 4, 2015, Pancho Reyes Huang found dead in his home at Iba, Zambales.

References

1955 births
2015 deaths
Filipino Roman Catholics
Mayors of places in Zambales
Lakas–CMD (1991) politicians
Far Eastern University alumni
People from Zambales